Hurricane Hernan was the second of three Category 5 hurricanes during the 2002 Pacific hurricane season. The twelfth tropical cyclone, tenth named storm and sixth hurricane of the season, Hernan originated from a tropical wave that formed in the Atlantic Ocean and crossed to the Pacific Ocean. The wave spawned a low-pressure area which organized into a tropical depression on August 30, a tropical storm on August 31 and a hurricane later that day. Hernan rapidly intensified and reached peak intensity as a Category 5 storm on the Saffir–Simpson hurricane scale. Proceeding northwest, it maintained this strength for eight hours, but on September 2 it entered cooler waters and began to weaken. By September 6 it had degenerated into a remnant area of low pressure.

Hernan was the second most intense hurricane of the season, and it maintained Category 5 status for the second-longest time of the season, behind Hurricane Kenna. Although Hernan remained far from land, swells of   caused minor beach erosion along the coast of Mexico. In addition, an associated remnant plume of moisture generated light shower activity in southern California as it tracked just offshore.

Meteorological history

On August 16, a tropical wave left the coast of Africa. It traveled westward across the Atlantic Ocean, crossing over Central America and emerging in the eastern Pacific, where it merged with a pre-existing Intertropical Convergence Zone disturbance. The system gradually developed moderate convection, and on August 30 it had developed sufficient convection to be designated Tropical Depression 10-E. The depression produced persistent strong thunderstorms, primarily in two areas of deep convection located to the northeast and west of the center of circulation. Although the center was elongated, wind shear over the system remained light and outflow was good, which led forecasters to predict modest intensification. Further organization occurred, and the center of circulation became encircled by convective thunderstorms.

Light wind shear and favorable ocean temperatures led to steady intensification of the storm, and satellite images indicated that an eye had developed late on August 31. The storm quickly reached Category 3 major hurricane on the Saffir–Simpson scale. As it continued strengthening, its eye became ragged, while its lateral movement to the northwest rose to 17 mph around the southern periphery of a strong deep-layer ridge over the United States.

On September 2, Hernan began weakening after its cloud tops had warmed slightly. Soon after, an eyewall replacement cycle began, causing the storm to be downgraded to Category 3 status, just before it turned slightly to the west later in the day. The storm underwent another eyewall replacement cycle as winds decreased further. As the storm entered cooler waters, it quickly weakened below major hurricane intensity. Soon Hernan was downgraded to Category 1 intensity, and its eye became cloud-filled. On September 5, Hernan was downgraded to a tropical storm as the storm rapidly decayed despite developing a new band of convection. Later in the day, the system was downgraded to a tropical depression as it began to lose its tropical characteristics. Strong wind shear developed, weakening the depression further. On September 6, the system degenerated into a remnant low-pressure system which spawned a remnant plume of moisture that meandered off the coast of California, producing light showers.

Intensity 

Impact
Hurricane Hernan remained far from shore and caused little damage to land. It brought light wind to Socorro Island off the coast of Mexico. Rough surf caused minor impact; in the open waters near the center of Hernan, waves generated by the storm were unofficially estimated to exceed . Along the coast of Mexico, waves reached , causing minor beach erosion. A portion of Hernan's remnant moisture off the southern California coast produced light rainfall and slippery roads.

See also

 Other tropical cyclones named Hernan
 List of Category 5 Pacific hurricanes
 List of California hurricanes

References

External links

 Tropical Cyclone Report
 Storm path

2002 Pacific hurricane season
Category 5 Pacific hurricanes
Pacific hurricanes in Mexico
Tropical cyclones in 2002